Silvia Paracchini FRSE is a geneticist who researches the contribution of genetic variation to neurodevelopmental traits such as dyslexia and human handedness.

Education 
As an undergraduate, Paracchini studied Biological Sciences at the University of Pavia, Italy.  During this time she undertook an ERASMUS scholarship project at the Technical University of Denmark.  She obtained her DPhil in Human Genetics from the University of Oxford in 2003.

Career and research 
After obtaining her doctorate, Paracchini held a post-doctoral research position with the Wellcome Trust Centre for Human Genetics from 2003 to 2011. In 2011, she was awarded a Royal Society University Research Fellowship. Her research group at the University of St Andrews School of Medicine explores the genetic underpinnings of human behavioral traits like handedness, and neurodevelopment disorders like dyslexia by combining large genetic screenings for quantitative measures followed by gene function characterization. In 2008, while working at the University of Oxford, she carried out a study on reading abilities in a cohort of  7 to 9 years old British children. The research established that the same variants of the KIAA0319 gene, already associated with dyslexia, affect the ability to read, even in the absence of a formal diagnosis of dyslexia.
In 2014 she proposed that the same mechanisms that establish left/right asymmetry in the body (e.g. Nodal signaling and ciliogenesis) also play a role in the development of brain asymmetry and contribute to handedness 
. She also contributed to the largest study of human handedness in the world giving the best estimate of 10.6% for left-handedness.

Honours and prizes 

 2005 European Society of Human Genetics, Young Investigator Award for Outstanding Science
 2011 Royal Society University Research Fellowship
 2014 Member of the Young Academy of Scotland
 2018 Fellow of the Royal Society of Biology
 2019 Fellow of the Royal Society of Edinburgh

In 2019, Paracchini featured in the Royal Society of Edinburgh's Women in Science in Scotland exhibition, which celebrated some of Scotland’s leading female scientists.

References 

Italian geneticists
Women geneticists
Fellows of the Royal Society of Edinburgh
Fellows of the Royal Society of Biology
Year of birth missing (living people)
Living people